The 2015–16 KHL season was the eighth season of the Kontinental Hockey League. The season started on 24 August 2015 with the Opening Cup between defending champions SKA Saint Petersburg and last year's Continental Cup winners CSKA Moscow, replacing Ak Bars Kazan, the previous season's Gagarin Cup finalists.

Team changes
Spartak Moscow returned to the league prior to this season. It was also announced by KHL President Dmitry Chernyshenko that Atlant Moscow Oblast would not participate in the league this season due to financial problems.

Divisions and regular season format
In this season, each team played every other team once at home and once on the road, giving a total of 54 games (27 at home, 27 on the road), plus 6 additional games (3 at home, 3 on the road) played by each team against rival clubs from its own conference. Thus, each team played a total of 60 games in the regular season.

How the teams are divided into divisions and conferences is shown in the table below.

League standings

Western Conference

Eastern Conference

Gagarin Cup Playoffs

The playoffs started on 21 February 2016 with the top eight teams from each of the conferences, and ended with the last game of the Gagarin Cup final on 19 April 2016.

Final standings

Player statistics

Scoring leaders

  
As of 18 February 2016

Source: KHL

Leading goaltenders

As of 18 February 2016

Source: KHL

Awards

Players of the Month
Best KHL players of each month.

Milestones

References

External links
Season schedule 2015–16
Season regulations 2015–16

 
Kontinental Hockey League seasons
2015–16 in European ice hockey leagues
KHL
KHL
KHL